Kathy Wambe (born November 7, 1981) is a former professional basketball player who plays for Belfius Namur in Belgium. She was the 21st pick in the 2002 WNBA Draft, selected by Detroit Shock. In her career, she played for Belfius Namur (Belgium), Familia Schio (IItaly), Villeneuve (France), Taranto (Italy), Union Hainaut (France), and USVO (France).

References

External links
Kathy Wambe | EuroLeague Women

1981 births
Living people
Belgian women's basketball players
Sportspeople from Tournai
Point guards